Bruno Huger (born 10 August 1962) is a French former professional racing cyclist. He rode in the 1986 Tour de France.

References

External links
 

1962 births
Living people
French male cyclists
Sportspeople from Loir-et-Cher
Cyclists from Centre-Val de Loire